Conrad I or Konrad I may refer to:

 Conrad I, Count of Auxerre (died c. 864), French count of several counties, including Paris 859–862/4
 Conrad I of Germany (881–918), Duke of Franconia and King of Germany in 911–918
 Conrad of Constance (900–975), German bishop and saint
 Conrad I, Duke of Swabia (915/920-997), ruled 983–997
 Conrad, Duke of Lorraine (c. 922 – 955)
 Conrad I of Burgundy (925–993)
 Conrad I of Spoleto, or Conrad of Ivrea (died 997)
 Conrad I, Duke of Carinthia (975–1011)
 Conrad I of Italy (989/990–1039), ruled as Conrad II, Holy Roman Emperor 1027–1039
 Conrad I, Duke of Bavaria (1020–1055), ruled 1049–1053
 Conrad I, Duke of Bohemia (c. 1035–1092), Duke of Bohemia in 1092
 Conrad I, Count of Luxembourg (1040-1086)
 Conrad I of Salzburg (c. 1075–1147), Archbishop of Salzburg 1106–1147
 Conrad I, Count of Württemberg (born before 1081), ruled 1083–1110
 Conrad I of Raabs (died 1143), Burgrave of Nuremberg c. 1105–1143
 Conrad I, Duke of Zähringen (c. 1090–1152)
 Conrad, Margrave of Meissen (c. 1097–1157), ruled 1123–1156
 Conrad I, Duke of Merania (died 1159), ruled 1152–1159
 Conrad of Montferrat or Conrad I of Jerusalem (died 1192), King of Jerusalem in 1190–1192
 Conrad of Wittelsbach (c. 1120/1125–1200), Archbishop of Mainz 1161–1165 and 1183–1200
 Conrad I, Duke of Spoleto (died 1202)
 Conrad I, Burgrave of Nuremberg (c. 1186–1261), ruled 1218–1261
 Konrad I of Masovia (c. 1187/8–1247), 6th Duke of Masovia, son of Casimir II and Helen of Moravia
 Conrad of Thuringia (1206–1240)
 Conrad I of Sanneck (died before 1255), Lord of Žovnek (Sanneck), in what is now Slovenia
 Konrad I of Meissen, or Konrad von Wallhausen (died 1258), Bishop of Meissen 1240–1258
 Conrad I of Sicily, also Conrad IV of Germany, (1228–1254)
 Konrad I, Duke of Głogów (c. 1228/29–1273/74)
 Conrad, Margrave of Brandenburg-Stendal (c. 1240–1304)
 Conrad I, Count of Oldenburg (died 1347)
 Konrad I of Oleśnica (c. 1294–1366)